Zaza Burchuladze (born 9 September 1973 in Tbilisi, Georgia) is a contemporary postmodern Georgian novelist and dramatist. Currently, he lives and works in Berlin, Germany.

Biography 
Zaza Burchuladze graduated from the monumental and ornamental painting department of Tbilisi State Academy of Arts.

Since 1998 he has been publishing his stories in Georgian newspapers and magazines. He worked as a freelance journalist for Radio Free Europe/Radio Liberty and taught literature and contemporary art at the Caucasian Media Institute

Until 2001 Burchuladze published his works under a pen-name of Gregor Samsa. He translated the books of Fyodor Dostoyevsky and Daniil Kharms into Georgian.

His narratives often startle the audience with his experimental way of writing and the provocative themes that the author takes up and mostly are considered taboos. He writes about political conformity, stories about violence and brutality, addressing ideological and religious topics as well as sexuality.

Burchuladze's books have been translated into several languages.

Bibliography

Novels 
 Tourist Breakfast, Tbilisi, Bakur Sulakauri Publishing, 2015
 Inflatable Angel, Tbilisi, Bakur Sulakauri Publishing, 2011
 adibas, Tbilisi, Bakur Sulakauri Publishing, 2009
 Instant Kafka, Tbilisi, Bakur Sulakauri Publishing, 2005
 Mineral Jazz, Tbilisi, Bakur Sulakauri Publishing in 2003

Translations 
 Inflatable Angel, German, Aufbau Verlag / Blumenbar, 2018
 Tourist Breakfast, German, Aufbau Verlag / Blumenbar, 2017
 adibas, Czech, Dobrovsky, 2016
 adibas, German, Aufbau Verlag / Blumenbar, 2015
 Inflatable Angel, Russian, Ad Marginem, 2014
 adibas, English, Dalckey Archive, 2014
 Inflatable Angel, French, L'Âge d'Homme, 2013
 adibas, Russian, Ad Marginem, 2011
 Instant Kafka, Russian, Ad Marginem, 2008
 Mineral Jazz, Russian, Ad Marginem, 2007

Literary awards 
 Work Stipend from Senate of Berlin, 2020
 „Brücke Berlin“ Prize for Tourist Breakfast, 2018
 Best Georgian Novel of the year (Iliauni Prize) for Inflatable Angel, 2011
 Best Georgian Novel of the year (Tsinandali prize) for Mineral Jazz, 2003

References 

1973 births
Living people
Writers from Tbilisi
Tbilisi State Academy of Arts alumni
Postmodern writers